Cortain (also spelled Courtain, Cortana, Curtana, Cortaine, etc.) is a legendary short sword in the legend of Ogier the Dane. This name is the accusative case declension of Old French corte, meaning "short".

The tradition that Ogier had a short sword is quite old. The sword name does not appear in the oldest extant copy of The Song of Roland (Oxford manuscript), only in versions postdating the Nota. According to the first part (enfances) of Le Chevalerie Ogier, the sword, which once belonged to Brumadant the Savage, was remade more than twenty times; finally it was tested on a block of marble and broke about a palm's length. It was reforged and named Corte or Cortain, meaning "short". This became the weapon of a chivalric-minded Saracen named Karaheut, who gives it to Ogier so he can fight Brunamont in single combat. The sword has appeared in chansons de geste somewhat predating Chevalerie Ogier, or composed around the same time as it, such as Aspremont (before 1190) and Renaut de Montauban (c. 1200).

The Prose Tristan (1230–1235, expanded in 1240) states that Ogier inherited the sword of the Arthurian knight Tristan (Tristram), shortening it and thus called it Cortaine. The English monarchy also laid claim to owning "Tristram's sword", and this according to Roger Sherman Loomis was the "Curtana" ("short") used in the coronation of the British monarch. Loomis also argues that Curtana's origins as Tristram's sword was known to the author of this passage in Prose Tristan, but the tradition was forgotten in England.

Notes

References
Citations

Bibliography
 
 
 

Fictional swords